The Circle is the fourteenth studio album by the Japanese rock duo B'z, released on April 6, 2005.

Track listing
"The Circle" – 1:57
"X" – 3:55
"パルス" [Pulse] – 2:45
"愛のバクダン" [Ai no Bakudan → Love Bomb] – 4:24
"Fly The Flag" – 3:45
"アクアブルー" [Aqua Blue] – 3:20
"睡蓮" [Suiren → Water Lily] – 4:11
"Sanctuary" – 3:43
"Fever" – 4:17
"白い火花" [Shiroi Hibana → White Spark] – 3:59
"イカロス" [Icarus] – 3:32
"Black and White" – 4:24
"Brighter Day" – 3:57

Personnel
Tak Matsumoto (guitar)
Koshi Inaba (vocals)

Additional personnel
Akihito Tokunaga (bass & programming)
Brian Tichy (drums) - Track 12
Shane Gaalaas (drums and percussion)

Certifications

References

External links
B'z official Web site (in Japanese)

B'z albums
Being Inc. albums
2005 albums
Japanese-language albums